John Saul is an American author.

John Saul may also refer to:

 John Hennessy Saul (1819–1897), Irish-born American horticulturist and landscape architect
 John L. Saul (born 1948), British novelist and short story writer
 John Ralston Saul (born 1947), Canadian philosopher
 John S. Saul (born 1938), Canadian political economist and activist
 John Saul (prostitute), male prostitute in the Cleveland Street scandal
 John Saul (actor) (1913–1979), Australian actor and director